Leo Lewis may refer to:

Leo Lewis (running back) (1933–2013), American football running back in the CFL
Leo Lewis (wide receiver) (born 1956), American football wide receiver in the NFL and CFL
Leo Rich Lewis (1865–1945), American composer

See also
Leonard Lewis
Leopold Lewis